Martin Davis Eichelberger, Jr. (born September 3, 1943) is an American professional golfer who has won several tournaments at both the PGA Tour and Champions Tour levels.

Eichelberger was born in Waco, Texas. He started in the game at the age of 13 in the junior programs at his family's golf club in Waco. He attended Oklahoma State University in Stillwater, Oklahoma; and while there blossomed into an outstanding amateur. He led the Oklahoma State Cowboys to the 1963 NCAA Championship. He graduated in 1965 and turned pro in 1966.

Eichelberger has twelve professional victories. Four of which came on the PGA Tour, plus six Champions Tour triumphs. On his way to a win at the 2002 Emerald Coast Classic, Eichelberger made a hole-in-one from 185 yards at the par 3 eighth hole during the first round of play.

Although he is a native Texan, Eichelberger lived most of his adult life in New Canaan, Connecticut. In 2003, he moved to Honolulu, Hawaii, where he lives today with his wife, son and daughter – fraternal twins.

Professional wins (12)

PGA Tour wins (4)

PGA Tour playoff record (1–1)

Other wins (1)
1979 JCPenney Mixed Team Classic (with Murle Breer)

Senior PGA Tour wins (6)

*Note: The 2002 Emerald Coast Classic was shortened to 36 holes due to rain.

Champions Tour playoff record (1–2)

Other senior wins (1)
1994 Diners Club Matches (with Raymond Floyd)

Results in major championships

Note: Eichelberger never played in The Open Championship.

CUT = missed the half way cut
"T" indicates a tie for a place.

Champions Tour major championships

Wins (1)

U.S. national team appearances
Walker Cup: 1965 (tied, cup retained)
Americas Cup: 1965

See also
1966 PGA Tour Qualifying School graduates
1986 PGA Tour Qualifying School graduates
1987 PGA Tour Qualifying School graduates

External links

American male golfers
Oklahoma State Cowboys golfers
PGA Tour golfers
PGA Tour Champions golfers
Winners of senior major golf championships
Golfers from Texas
Golfers from Connecticut
Golfers from Honolulu
Sportspeople from Waco, Texas
People from New Canaan, Connecticut
1943 births
Living people